Mohamed Mostafa Ahmad El-Shamy (born September 30, 1993) is an Egyptian footballer.

Career
El-Shamy plays as a midfielder for Egyptian Premier League club Tersana as well as the Egypt U-20 national team. He was a member of Egypt's squad for the 2013 FIFA U-20 World Cup, but did not appear in a match.

References

External links

1993 births
Living people
Egyptian footballers
Egypt international footballers
Association football defenders
Haras El Hodoud SC players
Footballers from Cairo